Mediterranean was a battle honour awarded to the following Militia battalions of the British Army for their service during the Crimean War of 1854-55, when they volunteered for garrison duty and relieved the regular battalions of their respective regiments for active service:

 49th, or East Kent Militia (later 3rd Battalion, the Buffs)
 55th, or Royal Westminster, or 3rd Middlesex Militia (later 5th Battalion, the Royal Fusiliers)
 66th, or King's Own (1st Staffordshire) Militia (later 3rd Battalion, the South Staffordshire Regiment)
 125th, or 3rd Royal Lancashire Militia (The Duke of Lancaster's Own) (later 3rd Battalion, the Loyal North Lancashire Regiment)
 7th, or Royal Berkshire Militia (later 3rd Battalion, the Royal Berkshire Regiment)
 45th, or 1st Royal Lancashire Militia (The Duke of Lancaster's Own) (later 3rd Battalion, the King's Own (Royal Lancaster Regiment))
 21st, or 2nd West York Light Infantry (later 3rd Battalion, the West Yorkshire Regiment)
 35th, or Royal Buckinghamshire Militia (King's Own) (later 3rd Battalion, the Oxfordshire and Buckinghamshire Light Infantry)
 48th, or Northampton Militia (later 3rd Battalion, the Northamptonshire Regiment)
 33rd, or Royal Wiltshire Militia (later 3rd Battalion, the Wiltshire Regiment)

This should not be confused with the award Mediterranean 1901–02 which was awarded for service in the Second Boer War.

The honour was allowed to lapse under an Army Order issued in October 1910.  This stated that battle honours awarded to former militia battalions were to cease to be borne: special reserve battalions could continue to carry colours with the old honours "as a temporary measure" if they chose, but only until they were presented with replacement colours.

References

Norman, C.B.: Battle Honours Of The British Army, From Tangier, 1662, To The Commencement Of The Reign Of King Edward VII. John Murray 1911, p. 11

Battle honours of the British Army